Serangoon Gardens Single Member Constituency was a single member constituency in Singapore. It was formed in 1959 by carving out from Serangoon Constituency as Serangoon Gardens Constituency. 

In 1976, parts of the constituency was carved out to form Ang Mo Kio Constituency. In 1980, more part of the constituency was carved out to form Cheng San and Chong Boon constituencies.

In 1988, the constituency was renamed as Serangoon Gardens Single Member Constituency (SMC) as part of Singapore's political reforms. 

In 1991, the constituency was abolished and merged into Thomson Group Representation Constituency.

Member of Parliament

Elections

Elections in 1950s

Elections in 1970s

References 

Singaporean electoral divisions
Serangoon